Audra Diane Mari (born January 8, 1994) is an American model, television host, and beauty pageant titleholder. She was crowned Miss World America 2016 on July 8, 2016, and represented the United States at Miss World 2016. She also represented the state of North Dakota at the Miss Teen USA and Miss USA pageants where she placed 1st runner-up in each pageant.

Early life
Mari was born on January 8, 1994, in Fargo, North Dakota. Her grandfather is from the Philippines. Mari attended Davies High School in Fargo. In an interview with Seventeen, she discussed being bullied her sophomore year of high school. She attended North Dakota State University, where she studied public relations and communications.

Career

Pageantry 
Mari represented the state of North Dakota on July 16, 2011, at Atlantis Paradise Island in Nassau, Bahamas where she placed 1st runner-up.  Three years later she won the Miss North Dakota USA 2014 title.  In the Miss USA 2014 pageant held in Baton Rouge, Louisiana she again placed 1st runner-up.  This was the highest placement for a contestant from North Dakota.

On July 8, 2016, Mari was crowned Miss World America 2016 at National Harbor in Washington, D.C. She represented the United States at the Miss World 2016 pageant on December 18, 2016, where she placed 6th. Because Mari was the highest placing Miss World contestant from the Americas, she was awarded the title of Miss World Americas 2016.

Modelling and television 
At age 20, Mari moved to Miami to pursue a modeling career. Her credits include gracing the cover of Ocean Drive Swimsuit issue and appearing in numerous H&M ads. Mari segued into hosting a television show on the Welcome Channel and in 2021, a local travel show for InForum online media.

Personal life 
Mari began dating actor Josh Duhamel in late 2018. They announced their engagement on January 8, 2022, and married on September 10, 2022.

References

External links
 Official Miss North Dakota website
Miss World America Official Website

1994 births
American beauty pageant winners
American female models
American models of Filipino descent
Female models from North Dakota
Living people
2011 beauty pageant contestants
21st-century Miss Teen USA delegates
Miss USA 2014 delegates
Miss World 2016 delegates
North Dakota State University alumni
People from Fargo, North Dakota